The Nevada Republican Party is the affiliate of the Republican Party in Nevada. The organization has a history that goes back to 1864. The party currently controls Nevada's governorship and lieutenant governorship, which are currently held by Joe Lombardo and Stavros Anthony respectively.

History
Nevada was founded as a state on October 31, 1864.  When the state was first formed it was a Republican state.  Some speculate that this was because of Nevadans' loyalty to the president who brought them into the Union, Abraham Lincoln.  In the first two general elections all the constitutionally elected positions went to the Republicans.  This changed starting in 1871 when four out of the six constitutional positions were won by the Democrats.

In the general elections of 1894 and 1898 the Silver Party, a party created to go against European and Eastern American bankers, swept the election.  Nevada first held a primary election in 1910. In 1929 the offices were split evenly between the Democratic and Republican Parties.  This was the turning point though.  Once the Great Depression hit the elections from 1932 to the 1990s the Democratic Party held the majority throughout the state.

In 1994 and in 1998 the Republicans were the majority in the state.  In 2002 Republicans swept all of the offices in Nevada.  In the 2004 election Nevada was considered a battleground state because the difference between the two parties that year was 4,431.  Throughout much of Nevada's political history it has been seen as a battleground state. Since 1992 the state has gone back and forth between Republican and Democratic candidates for the presidency.  In the elections of 1992 and 1996 the state voted for the Democratic candidate, in 2000 and 2004 they voted for the Republican candidate, and finally in the 2008 election the state voted for the Democrats.  This is primarily because of the rise of the Latino population.  Nevada was expected to be a battleground state in the presidential election in 2012 as well.

On June 23, 2018, President Donald Trump addressed the 2018 Nevada Republican Party State Convention in Las Vegas.

2020 election and aftermath 
In the aftermath of the 2020 presidential election, the Nevada GOP supported Donald Trump's false claims of fraud and attempts to overturn the election results in the state after Joe Biden was declared the victor. On November 3, 2020, the state GOP and the Trump campaign attempted to slow down the processing of mail-in ballots in Clark County, claiming that the county wasn't abiding by state law in allowing people to observe the processing of ballots. Soon after, Nevada Republicans made false claims surrounding the results in the county.

On November 5, the Nevada Republican Party alleged "at least 3,062 instances of voter fraud". Republican lawyers released a list of over 3,000 people who allegedly did not live in Clark County, Nevada, when they voted. However, these were not proven to be illegal votes, because Nevada (a) allows for people who moved states 30 days before the election to vote in Nevada's election, and (b) allows people studying in colleges in another state to vote in Nevada's election. Additionally, the list featured military members who were overseas and voted by mail.

On November 17, 2020, Nevada Republican representatives of the Trump campaign asked a judge to nullify Biden's 33,596-vote margin, and simply declare Trump the winner and his electors elected, citing unsubstantiated claims of fraud. However, on November 24, the Nevada Supreme Court certified Biden as the winner of the state. On December 4, 2020, the Nevada GOP vowed to appeal the certification of Biden's victory and overturn his win in the state. On December 14, hours after Nevada's six electors cast the state's electoral votes for Biden, Nevada Republican electors unofficially cast their symbolic votes for Trump. The Nevada GOP expressed support for the unofficial electors and alleged that there was fraud in the Nevada election.

In April 2021, the Nevada GOP censured Republican secretary of state Barbara Cegavske, accusing her of failing to investigate allegations of fraud in the 2020 election. Cegavske responded by saying that members of her party were attacking her for refusing to "put my thumb on the scale of democracy" and said that there was no evidence of widespread fraud in the election. In June 2021, the Nevada GOP expressed approval of the controversial Arizona audit and have considered whether they can enact a similar audit for the 2020 Nevada election.

By-laws
The By-laws of the Nevada Republicans were amended on December 13, 2008.  Article one says the name of the organization.  Article two describes its purpose.  The purpose of this political organization is to provide leadership, recruit, develop, and elect officials.  It wants to provide a responsible representative government.  It also wants  to keep the rights and freedom for all citizens.  Article three discusses the duties and the headquarters of this organization.  This article goes into details about how conventions should be held.  Article four provides the rules and regulations for the meetings.  These rules describe everything from when meetings should be held, how voting works, where these meetings are held, and everything in between.  Article five discusses membership in this organization.  The first is that the members must be part of the Republican Party.  They then go into the elected officials for the party.  Article six goes into details about the officers for the organization and their specific duties that those positions have. Article seven discusses elections while section eight talks about the standing committees and their responsibilities.

Article nine talks about the Republican organization and how it associates with it. Article ten goes into the voting and proxies in the Nevada State Republican party by-laws.  Article eleven discusses the executive committee, its membership and its duties.  Article twelve goes into detail about the requirements for the committees and the conventions.  Article thirteen talks about amendments to the by-laws, particularly how to make amendments to the by-laws.  Article fourteen discusses parliamentary authority while article fifteen talks about election laws.  Finally article sixteen goes into details about how the organization should support candidates.  It will not recognize any candidate who has been convicted of a felony or, while serving in a public office was impeached and convicted or removed from office for any reason, unless the Nevada Republican Central Committee or a Convention of the
Nevada Republican Party shall waive this rule by a two-thirds (2/3) vote of the members or delegates present.

Current elected officials
The Nevada Republican Party controls only one of the state's six statewide offices and the Republicans are the minority in both the Nevada Senate and the Nevada Assembly. Republicans hold none of the state's U.S. Senate seats and one of its four U.S. House of Representatives seats.

Members of Congress

U.S. Senate
 None

Both of Nevada's U.S. Senate seats have been held by Democrats since 2018. Dean Heller was the last Republican to represent Nevada in the U.S. Senate. First appointed in 2011 by then Governor Brian Sandoval following the resignation on John Ensign, Heller was elected to a full term in 2012 and subsequently lost his bid for a second term in 2018 to Jacky Rosen who has held the seat since.

U.S. House of Representatives
Out of the four seats Nevada is apportioned in the U.S. House of Representatives, one is held by a Republican:

Statewide offices
Republicans control three of the six elected statewide offices:
Governor: Joe Lombardo
Lieutenant Governor: Stavros Anthony
State Controller: Andy Matthews

State legislative leaders
Senate Minority Leader: James Settelmeyer
Assembly Minority Leader: Robin L. Titus

State Senate
Republican members of the Nevada Senate:
 Becky Harris, 9th District
 Joe Hardy, 12th District
 Don Gustavson, 14th District
 Heidi Gansert, 15th District
 Ben Kieckhefer, 16th District
 James Settelmeyer, 17th District
 Scott Hammond, 18th District
 Pete Goicoechea, 19th District
 Michael Roberson, 20th District

State Assembly
Republican members of the Nevada State Assembly:
 John Hambrick, 2nd District
 Richard McArthur, 4th District
 Paul Anderson, 13th District
 Chris Edwards, 19th District
 Keith Pickard, 22nd District
 Melissa Woodbury, 23rd District
 Jill Tolles, 25th District
 Lisa Krasner, 26th District
 Ira Hansen, 32nd District
 John Ellison, 33rd District
 James Oscarson, 36th District
 Jim Marchant, 37th District
 Robin L. Titus, 38th District
 Jim Wheeler, 39th District
 Al Kramer, 40th District

Executive Board
Chairman: Michael J. McDonald

Vice Chairman: Jim DeGraffenreid III

Secretary: Barbara Hawn

Treasurer: Michael Bertrand

National Committeeman: Lee Hoffman

National Committeewoman: Michele Fiore

Election results

Presidential

Gubernatorial

References

External links
 Nevada Republican Party

1864 establishments in Nevada
Political parties established in 1864
Republican Party
Nevada